Minister of State for Happiness and Wellbeing is a Minister of State in the United Arab Emirates Cabinet, which oversees the UAE plans, programs and policies to achieve a happier society. The responsibility of this office is to "align and drive government policy to create social good and satisfaction."

Ministers
On 10 February 2016, UAE Prime Minister Sheikh Mohammed bin Rashid Al Maktoum announced, through his Twitter account, the appointment of Her Excellency Ohoud Al Roumi - whose full name is Ohood bint Khalifa Al Roumi - as the country's first Minister of State for Happiness.[3] The announcement was made during Dubai's annual  World Government Summit.

Programs and Initiatives
In its first year (2016), as part of the overall National Happiness and Positivity Program, the Minister of State for Happiness launched a number of programs and initiatives. Some of these are:
 
Chief Happiness and Positivity Officer Program (private sector)
Chief Happiness and Positivity Officer Program (government)
Happy and Positive Offices
Customer Happiness Formula
Happiness and Positivity Councils
Happiness and Positivity Hours (federal government)
Happiness and Positivity Heroes Medal
Customer Happiness Employees
Customer Happiness Centres
UAE Declaration of Happiness and Positivity

Chief Happiness and Positivity Officer Program
In July 2016, the Minister of State for Happiness publicly announced the selection of 60 individuals, representing federal and local government entities, as the original cohort of the Chief Happiness and Positivity Program.

To learn the knowledge and develop the skills necessary to realize the objectives of the Chief Happiness and Positivity Officer Program, the selected candidates attend the Greater Good Science Center of the University of California, Berkeley and the Oxford Mindfulness Centre of the University of Oxford, two of several international partners enlisted by the UAE government to ensure the success of its Program.

The Program consists of five pillars: the science of happiness and positivity, mindfulness, leading a happy team, happiness and policies in government work, and measuring happiness.

See also 

 Ons Jabeur, Tunisian professional tennis player nicknamed "Minister of Happiness" in her country

References

Government of the United Arab Emirates